Owd Bob is a 1924 British drama film directed by Henry Edwards and starring J. Fisher White, Ralph Forbes and James Carew. It is based on the 1898 novel Owd Bob by Alfred Ollivant. Location shooting took place in the Lake District.

Cast
 J. Fisher White as Adam McAdam 
 Ralph Forbes as Davie McAdam 
 James Carew as James Moore 
 Yvonne Thomas as Maggie Moore 
 Frank Stanmore as Jim Burton 
 Grace Lane as Mrs. Moore 
 Robert English as Squire 
 John Marlborough East as Shepherd

References

Bibliography
 Sweet, Matthew. Shepperton Babylon: The Lost Worlds of British Cinema. Faber and Faber, 2005.

External links

1924 films
British silent feature films
1924 drama films
1920s English-language films
Films directed by Henry Edwards
British drama films
British black-and-white films
Films based on British novels
1920s British films
Silent drama films